Adam Naglich (born May 9, 1984) is an American former professional ice hockey player who last played for the Vienna Capitals of the Austrian Hockey League (EBEL).

Undrafted, Naglich began his professional career with the Bakersfield Condors of the ECHL in the 2009–10 season before opting to pursue a European career in the EBEL.  He has formerly played with Croatian club, KHL Medveščak and Hungarian club, Alba Volán Székesfehérvár in the EBEL before joining the Vienna Capitals on a one-year contract on August 2, 2014.

At the conclusion of the 2014–15 season with the Vienna Capitals, Naglich retired from professional hockey at returned to settle in his hometown Las Vegas, Nevada.

References

External links

1984 births
Alaska Nanooks men's ice hockey players
Fehérvár AV19 players
American men's ice hockey right wingers
Bakersfield Condors (1998–2015) players
Ice hockey people from Nevada
KHL Medveščak Zagreb players
Living people
Victoria Salsa players
Vienna Capitals players
American expatriate ice hockey players in Austria
American expatriate ice hockey players in Croatia
American expatriate ice hockey players in Hungary